Karnataka Forest Service (abbreviated as KFS) or known as State Forest Service (abbreviated as SFS) is awarded to a person who is selected in the KFS exam conducted by Karnataka Public Service Commission (KPSC). Selected officers will be appointed by the Government of Karnataka as The Assistant Conservator of Forests after completing the training period of 2 years at Central Academy for State Forest Service Dehradun or Central Academy for State Forest Service Coimbatore and Completing the probationary period of 2 years as The Range Forest Officer. The post of Assistant Conservator of Forests is equivalent to the post of Assistant commissioner and also equivalent to the post of Assistant Commissioner of Police. The officer who is recruited as Assistant Conservator of Forests is a person entrusted with responsibility to manage the forests, environment, and wildlife of the concerned Sub-Division and he will be assisted by the officers belonging to Karnataka Forest Subordinate Service.

References

Sources
 Karnataka Forest Department
 Ministry of Environment, Forest and Climate Change

Environment of Karnataka
State forest departments of India
Year of establishment missing